Franklin Ulises Delgado (born 18 February 1966) is a retired Panamanian football defender.

Club career
Nicknamed Morocho (The dark-haired), Delgado was named 1989 MVP of the year of the second ANAPROF season, when playing for Pan de Azúcar. He had spells abroad at Salvadoran sides Municipal Limeño and Tiburones and in Honduras with Platense whom he joined in September 1995. He extended his stay at local side San Francisco in summer 2001 for a final season after joining them in summer 2000 from Sporting'89.

International career
Delgado made his debut for Panama in a July 1988 FIFA World Cup qualification match against Costa Rica and has earned a total of 49 caps, scoring no goals. He represented his country in 21 FIFA World Cup qualification matches and played at the 1993 CONCACAF Gold Cup.

His final international was a November 2000 FIFA World Cup qualification match against Trinidad and Tobago.

References

External links
 

1966 births
Living people
Association football central defenders
Panamanian footballers
Panama international footballers
1993 UNCAF Nations Cup players
1995 UNCAF Nations Cup players
1993 CONCACAF Gold Cup players
Sporting San Miguelito players
San Francisco F.C. players
Platense F.C. players
Panamanian expatriate footballers
Expatriate footballers in El Salvador
Expatriate footballers in Honduras